The CZ 110 is a lightweight Czech 9 mm semi-automatic pistol developed and produced by Česká Zbrojovka of Uherský Brod. The CZ 110 is a double-action (DA) variant of the CZ 100.

Design details
The CZ 110 is a recoil-operated, locked-breech semi-automatic pistol that features a short-recoiling barrel that locks to the slide with a single massive lug which engages the ejection port cut-out when locked. To unlock, the barrel is cammed down by the interaction of the shaped cam on the barrel and the angular camming guide in the frame.

The frame of CZ 110 is made from an impact-resistant polymer while the slide is made from steel, which was ČZ's entry into the polymer-frame pistol market.

The CZ 110 is a striker-fired pistol; the firing pin (striker) can be fully cocked by the slide retraction cycle and then, if immediate fire is not required, can be brought down to rest by the decocking lever. The only other safeties is a firing pin block and a loaded chamber indicator. The CZ 110 also features an accessory rail for attaching a laser or light.

The pistol is designed to be carried with a loaded chamber and firing pin at rest; it has a double-action trigger mechanism.

CZ 110 is available chambered in 9×19mm Parabellum, 9×21mm IMI or .40 S&W calibers.

See also
Heckler & Koch USP
Walther P99

External links
Česká Zbrojovka – official page
Instruction manual
EnemyForces.com
Modern Firearms

.40 S&W semi-automatic pistols
9mm Parabellum semi-automatic pistols
9×21mm IMI semi-automatic pistols
Semi-automatic pistols of Czechoslovakia
Short recoil firearms